Klinesville is an unincorporated community in Greenwich Township in Berks County, Pennsylvania, United States. Klinesville is located at the intersection of Old Route 22 and Kohlers Hill Road. In 2019, several homes in Klinesville were demolished in order to widen Interstate 78/U.S. Route 22.

References

Unincorporated communities in Berks County, Pennsylvania
Unincorporated communities in Pennsylvania